Australia–Yugoslavia relations were historical foreign relations between now split-up Socialist Federal Republic of Yugoslavia and Australia. Australia and Yugoslavia established formal diplomatic relations in 1966. Two countries decided to establish embassies, initially at the Charge d'Affaires level, to facilitate practical contacts, particularly in the field of migration. Australia recognized advantages of special relations and contacts with other countries in Eastern Europe but also the role it played in many of the meetings and activities of Non-Aligned countries. Relations between two countries were complicated by Yugoslav bad relations with its emigration in Australia which was often perceived to be significantly prone towards radical nationalism, anti-Yugoslavism and even widespread sympathies for the World War II collaborationist movements. Delegation of the Parliament of Yugoslavia visited Australia in 1970, while the Parliament of Australia returned visit (led by William Aston) in February 1971.

In 1988 a nationalist diaspora led anti-Yugoslav demonstration in front of the Yugoslav Consulate in Sydney resulted in security guard shooting and wounding Josef Tokic. This led to diplomatic crisis in relations between the two countries when Australian side presented the consulate with an rejected ultimatum to surrender Zoran Matijaš, the security guard involved in the incident. Two countries expelled a certain number of diplomats (including Zoran Matijaš who was welcomed in Belgrade as a hero) but avoided trade retaliation.

Following the breakup of Yugoslavia and Yugoslav Wars judges Ninian Stephen, David Hunt and Kevin Parker from Australia served at the International Criminal Tribunal for the former Yugoslavia. Australia also sent its armed forces to the United Nations Protection Force, Implementation Force and Stabilisation Force in Bosnia and Herzegovina.

See also
Yugoslavia and the Non-Aligned Movement
Death and state funeral of Josip Broz Tito
Australia–Croatia relations
Croatian Australians
Australia–Kosovo relations
Australia–North Macedonia relations
Macedonian Australians
Australia–Serbia relations
Serbian Australians
Australia–Slovenia relations
Slovenian Australians
Yugoslavia at the 1956 Summer Olympics
Australia at the 1984 Winter Olympics

References

Australia
Yugoslavia
Australia–Yugoslavia relations
Australia–Bosnia and Herzegovina relations
Australia–Croatia relations
Australia–Kosovo relations
Australia–Montenegro relations
Australia–North Macedonia relations
Australia–Serbia relations
Australia–Slovenia relations